Kenny Martín Pérez (born 10 August 1994) is a male Colombian racewalker. He competed in the 20 kilometres walk event at the 2015 World Championships in Athletics in Beijing, China, and finished the 50th, the last one of all participants who completed the distance.

See also
 Colombia at the 2015 World Championships in Athletics

References

Place of birth missing (living people)
1994 births
Living people
Colombian male racewalkers
World Athletics Championships athletes for Colombia
21st-century Colombian people